San Francesco may refer to:

 San Francesco d'Assisi ( 1182–1226),  Italian Catholic friar, deacon, philosopher, mystic, and preacher
 San Francesco al Campo, a municipality in the Metropolitan City of Turin, Piedmont, Italy

Churches in Italy
 San Francesco, Acquasparta, Umbria
 San Francesco, Acqui Terme, Piedmont
 San Francesco, Andria, Apulia
 San Francesco, Atri, Abruzzo
 San Francesco, Barga, Tuscany
 San Francesco, Bologna, Emilia-Romagna
 San Francesco, Cagli, Marche
 San Francesco, Canicattì, Sicily
 San Francesco, Cingoli, Marche
 San Francesco, Civitanova Marche, Marche
 San Francesco, Deruta, Umbria
 San Francesco, Fanano, Emilia-Romagna
 San Francesco, Ferrara, Emilia-Romagna
 San Francesco, Fidenza, Emilia-Romagna
 San Francesco, Grosseto, Tuscany
 San Francesco, Gubbio, Tuscany
 San Francesco, Larino, Molise
 San Francesco, Lucca, Tuscany
 San Francesco, Matelica, Marche
 San Francesco, Mondavio, Marche
 San Francesco, Montefalco, Umbria
 San Francesco, Modena, Emilia-Romagna
 San Francesco, Mantua, Lombardy
 San Francesco, Narni, Umbria
 San Francesco, Rieti, Lazio
 San Francesco, Sarzana, Liguria
 San Francesco, Treia, Marche
 San Francesco, Orvieto, Umbria
 San Francesco, Pescia, Tuscany
 San Francesco, Pienza, Tuscany
 San Francesco, Pievebovigliana, Marche
 San Francesco, Pioraco, Marche
 San Francesco, Prato, Tuscany
 San Francesco, Vetralla, Lazio
 San Francesco, Viterbo, Lazio
 San Francesco, Urbania, Marche

See also
 Basilica of Saint Francis of Assisi, a church in Assisi, Umbria, Italy
 Feast of Saints Francis and Catherine
 St. Francis (disambiguation)